Abdul Rashid, known as Rashid Junior, (3 March 1947 – 4 November 2020) was a Pakistani field hockey player. He competed at the 1968 Summer Olympics, the 1972 Summer Olympics and the 1976 Summer Olympics. He was part of the gold, silver and bronze winning teams at those Olympics respectively. On 4 November 2020, it was announced that Rashid had died.

Abdul Rashid played hockey from 1968 to 1976. During these years, he won 7 gold medals, 3 silver and 1 bronze medal. He also captained Pakistan to victory in the International Hockey Tournament at Christchurch in 1974.  Rashid Junior played 90 international matches and scored around 100 goals. He was the lone scorer in the final of the 1970 Asian Game against India in Bangkok. Rashid Junior also participated in two Olympics- Mexico City (1968) and Munich (1972) besides the Inaugural Cup at Barcelona (1971). Rashid Junior was the brother of former Pakistan Captain Olympian Abdul Hameed 'Hameedi'. 

On 23 March 1995, Rashid Junior was awarded with the Pride of Performance by President Farooq Leghari.

References

External links
 

1947 births
2020 deaths
Pakistani male field hockey players
Olympic field hockey players of Pakistan
Field hockey players at the 1968 Summer Olympics
Field hockey players at the 1972 Summer Olympics
Field hockey players at the 1976 Summer Olympics
Olympic gold medalists for Pakistan
Olympic silver medalists for Pakistan
Olympic bronze medalists for Pakistan
Olympic medalists in field hockey
Medalists at the 1968 Summer Olympics
Medalists at the 1972 Summer Olympics
Medalists at the 1976 Summer Olympics
People from Bannu District
Asian Games medalists in field hockey
Asian Games gold medalists for Pakistan
Asian Games silver medalists for Pakistan
Medalists at the 1966 Asian Games
Medalists at the 1970 Asian Games
Medalists at the 1974 Asian Games
Field hockey players at the 1970 Asian Games
Field hockey players at the 1966 Asian Games